Nemia is a genus of insects belonging to the family Nemopteridae.

The species of this genus are found in Southern Africa.

Species:
 Nemia angulata (Westwood, 1836) 
 Nemia costalis (Westwood, 1836)

References

Neuroptera
Neuroptera genera